Azidotetrazolate (CN7−) is an anion which forms a highly explosive series of salts. The ion is made by removing a proton from 5-azido-1H-tetrazole.  The molecular structure contains a five-membered ring with four nitrogen atoms, and an azido side chain connected to the carbon atom. Several salts exist, but they are unstable and spontaneously explode. Rubidium azidotetrazolate was so unstable that it explodes while crystallizing. The potassium and caesium salt also spontaneously explode when dry.

Azidotetrazolates are under investigation for use as bullet propellant, rocket propellants and high explosives. The nitrogen base compounds have the advantage of being "green explosives", meaning that their waste products are safe. Amongst the tetrazolates, they have the highest nitrogen fraction.

Properties
Different stimuli can set off explosions. Possibilities include impact, friction, sparks or heat. Guanidinium azidotetrazolate could be melted to an ionic liquid at 100°C, but would decompose smoothly at 159°. Sodium azidotetrazolate explodes when the temperature reaches 155°C.

The CNNNN ring in azidotetrazolate is planar and aromatic. The NNN side chain is attached to the carbon atom, and bent at the first nitrogen so that it is roughly parallel to the ring.

The base acids, 5-azido-1H-tetrazole and 5-azido-2H-tetrazole both can exist. The 1H version has a hydrogen atom bonded to a nitrogen atom next to the carbon.  It is the stable form in solids and solutions in polar liquids.  This is explained by a favourable hydrogen bond, and a greater dipole moment. The 2H version with hydrogen attached in the second nitrogen from the carbon is purportedly more stable in the gas phase.

Formation
The azidotetrazolate ion can be made from cyanogen bromide and sodium azide in water:

BrCN + 2NaN3 → N4CN3− + Na+ + NaBr

Salts

Related
Chemicals related to the azidotetrazolate anion include 1-diazidocarbamoyl-5-azidotetrazole with the same percentage of nitrogen.

References

External links

Tetrazoles
Organoazides